Sheikh Abu Naser Stadium, previously known as Bir Shrestha Shahid Flight Lieutenant Motiur Rahman Stadium is a Test cricket venue in Khulna, Bangladesh.

History
Khulna, situated in the south-western corner of the country, is the third-largest industrial centre in Bangladesh. The stadium holds 15,600 people and opened in 2004, as one of the five purpose-built cricket grounds established in the run-up to the 2004 Under-19 World Cup. It has a field dimension of 183 m X 137 m. It is the home stadium of the local Bangladesh Premier League franchise Khulna Titans. It was granted One Day International (ODI) status in January 2006. The stadium became the seventh Test venue in the country when it hosted the second Test between Bangladesh and West Indies in November 2012.

First Test, ODI, T20I
The ground hosted its first Test match from 21 to 25 November 2012 when Bangladesh played against the West Indies, with the home team losing by 10 wickets. The first ODI, between Bangladesh and Kenya, had taken place on 20 March 2006. The stadium hosted its first Twenty20 International (T20I), between Bangladesh and Zimbabwe, on 28 Nov 2006, with the match being the first T20I to take place in Bangladesh.

Stats and records

Up to 8 October 2018 the venue has hosted
 Test matches − 3
 ODI − 4
 T20I − 5
 In the debut Test at the venue, Abul Hasan made also his debut, and became only the second cricketer to make a century on debut as a number 10 batsman. He scored 100 off 113 balls.
 In the 2nd ODI at this venue, Sohag Gazi made his debut against West Indies and recorded his best bowling figure 4-29, earning him Man of the Match award.
 In the 3rd ODI at this venue, also against West Indies, Anamul Haque made his first ODI century, that earned him Man of the Match. In the match Bangladesh managed their largest ODI victory by runs (161).
 On 3 November 2014, during the 2nd Test at this venue, Shakib Al Hasan became only 3rd cricketer in the world to take 10 wicket or more and score a century in a same Test, after Ian Botham and Imran Khan. He achieved this feat against Zimbabwe. He scored 137 runs and took 10 wickets for 124 runs.
 In 3 Test matches hosted by this venue, Bangladesh got 3 different result. In the first Test (2012) they lost to West Indies, in 2nd Test (2014) they defeated Zimbabwe, in 3rd Test (2015) they drew against Pakistan.
 In ODIs Bangladesh won all 4 matches at this ground, against Kenya, Zimbabwe (both 2006) and twice against West Indies (2012).
 On 2 May 2015 Bangladesh drew their first ever Test match against Pakistan with Tamim Iqbal scoring his first double century, which was also the  highest individual score by a Bangladeshi Batsmen.

BPL 2013

Khulna hosted matches of the Bangladesh Premier League for the first time, making it the third venue of the competition. 8 matches were played here from 22 to 25 January 2013. Home team Khulna Royal Bengals played 3 matches, of which they won the last two.

See also
 List of International cricket five-wicket hauls at the Sheikh Abu Naser Stadium
 Stadiums in Bangladesh
 Tangail Stadium
 List of stadiums in Asia
 List of Test cricket grounds
 List of international cricket grounds in Bangladesh
 Sheikh Kamal International Stadium, Cox's Bazar
 Sheikh Kamal International Stadium, Gopalganj

References

External links
 CricketArchive

Cricket grounds in Bangladesh
Test cricket grounds in Bangladesh
Buildings and structures in Khulna
Sport in Khulna
Sports venues completed in 2004
2004 establishments in Bangladesh